= Horquilla, Chaco =

Coordinates: 27°32′S 59°58′W

Horquilla (Chaco)
- Municipality and village
- Interactive map of Horquilla (Chaco)
- Country: Argentina
- Province: Chaco Province
- Time zone: UTC−3 (ART)

Horquilla is a village and municipality in Chaco Province in northern Argentina.
